was a Japanese track and field athlete. He competed in the men's hammer throw at the 1936 Summer Olympics.

References

External links
 

1914 births
Year of death missing
Place of birth missing
Japanese male hammer throwers
Japanese male discus throwers
Olympic male hammer throwers
Olympic athletes of Japan
Athletes (track and field) at the 1936 Summer Olympics
Japan Championships in Athletics winners
20th-century Japanese people